Newsome Academy (formerly Newsome High School and Newsome High School & Sports College) is a co-educational secondary school located in Newsome (near Huddersfield), West Yorkshire, England.

The catchment area of the school includes Newsome, Lowerhouses, Lockwood, Berry Brow and Almondbury.

Previously a community school administered by Kirklees Council, in March 2021 Newsome High School converted to academy status and was renamed Newsome Academy. The school is now sponsored by the Impact Education Academy Trust.

Newsome Academy offers GCSEs, BTECs and NCFEs as programmes of study for pupils.

References

External links

Academies in Kirklees
Secondary schools in Kirklees